"She Can't Say That Anymore" is a song written by Sonny Throckmorton, and recorded by American country music performer John Conlee. It was released in September 1980 as the second single from the album Friday Night Blues. The song reached #2 on the Billboard Hot Country Singles & Tracks chart.

New York-based no wave artist Cristina covered this song on her second album Sleep It Off.

Chart performance

References

1980 singles
John Conlee songs
Songs written by Sonny Throckmorton
MCA Records singles
1980 songs